Ukraine competed at the 2015 Winter Universiade in Granada, Spain, and Štrbské Pleso/Osrblie, Slovakia. The Ukrainian team consisted of 52 athletes (13th team by number of athletes) who competed in alpine skiing, biathlon, cross-country skiing, figure skating, Nordic combined, short track speed skating, ski jumping, and snowboarding. The team was not represented in curling, freestyle skiing, and ice hockey. Ukraine won 5 medals (all in biathlon) and shared 13th rank with Austria.

Medalists

Alpine skiing

Men

Women

Biathlon

Men

Women

Mixed

Cross country skiing

Men

Women

Mixed

Figure skating

Nordic combined

Short track speed skating

Men

Women

Ski jumping

Men

Snowboarding

Men

See also
 Ukraine at the 2015 Summer Universiade

References

Sources
 Results book
 Results

2015 Winter Universiade
Ukraine at the Winter Universiade
Winter Universiade
Nations at the 2015 Winter Universiade